is a Japanese company manufacturing photographic lenses, optical components and commercial/industrial-use optics. Tamron Headquarters is located in Saitama City in the Saitama Prefecture of Japan.

The name of the company came from the surname of Uhyoue Tamura who was instrumental in developing Tamron's optical technologies. It was only on the company's 20th anniversary that the name was changed to Tamron (from Taisei Optical).

Sony Corporation maintains a 12.07% share hold in Tamron, making it the second-largest shareholder below New Well Co., Ltd (ニューウェル株式会社) with 18.89% (as of June 30, 2020). In the fiscal year ending 31 December 2017, net sales totaled 60.496 billion yen and operating income was 4.24 billion yen, up 79.8% from 2016. At that time, the consolidated company had 4,640 employees and five production plants: in Hirosaki, Namioka and Owani in Japan, and one in China and Viet Nam, respectively. Subsidiary companies were located in the U.S., Germany, France, Hong Kong, Shanghai, Moscow and Haryana, India.

History

1950 November – Taisei Optical Manufacturing Company founded, to manufacture lenses for cameras and binoculars.
1952 October – Taisei Optical Industries established with a capital of 2.5 million yen.
1958 – ‘Tamron’ trademark registered.
1970 April – Trade name changed to Tamron Co., Ltd.
1979 April – Tamron Industries, Inc. (presently Tamron USA, Inc.) established in New York City.
1982 September – Tamron Vertriebs GmbH established in Germany.
1984 February – Optech Tamron Co., Ltd. is established in Namioka, Aomori Prefecture.
1984 August – Shares listed with Japan Securities Dealers Association (currently JASDAQ) in Tokyo for over-the-counter transactions.
1985 December – Tamron Fine Giken Co., Ltd., a plant for making precision metal molds is established.
1986 January – Injection molding plant is established in Owani, Aomori.
1991 June – Optech Tamron Co., Ltd., is absorbed by Tamron Co., Ltd.
1995 February – Tamron acquires 75% capital of Bronica Co., Ltd., entering into the medium-format camera business
1995 April – Tamron (UK) Ltd. is established in the U.K.
1997 May – Tamron Industries (Hong Kong) is established in Hong Kong.
1997 July – Tamron Optical (Foshan) Co., Ltd. is established in Foshan, Guangdong, People’s Republic of China.
1998 July – Bronica Co., Ltd. is merged into Tamron Co., Ltd.
2000 June – Tamron Fine Giken is merged into Tamron Co., Ltd.
2000 June – Tamron France EURL is established in France.
2005 October – Tamron Optical (Shanghai) Co., Ltd. is established in Shanghai, People’s Republic of China.
2006 November – Tamron listed on the 1st Section of the Tokyo Stock Exchange.
2008 May – Tamron Co., Ltd. Taiwan manufacturing factory opened in Tainan, Taiwan.
2009 July – Tamron Co., Ltd. India Liaison Office opened in Haryana, India.
2009 November – Tamron Europe GmbH. Moscow Representative Office opened in Moscow, Russia.
2013 June – Tamron India Pvt Ltd.opened in Haryana, India.
2016 – Sale of compact camera lens modules began.
2017 – Sale of drone camera lens modules began and Tamron acquired Toumeigiken Co.

Products

Photographic lenses

Tamron has sold more than 5 million lenses as of September 2014. In the 2017 fiscal year, such lenses accounted for 74.9% of all sales.

 Interchangeable lenses for digital and conventional SLR cameras, including compact high-ratio zoom lenses of which Tamron was the pioneer in 1992 when it released the 28–200 mm. The most-current lens of this type is the AF 16–300 mm F/3.5-6.3 Di II VC PZD MACRO. Tamron was the maker of the manual-focus Adaptall series which have interchangeable mounts for multiple camera brands. These replaced an older series of interchangeable mount lens, the Adaptamatic lenses, which offered less functionality. Tamron was also responsible for the development of the t2 or T-mount adapter system.
 Fixed-focal wideangle, telephoto and macro lenses;
 Zoom lenses of various focal length ranges;
 Teleconverters.

Optical components
 Camcorder lenses
 Digital still camera lenses
 Cellular phone camera lenses

Commercial and industrial-use optics
 CCTV camera lenses for
 Surveillance
 Industrial vision
 Image-processing
 Projection lenses, test plates, high precision molds, injection-molded parts & components, optical device units, etc.

List of photographic lenses
Most current Tamron lenses are available for Sony E-mount, Nikon F-mount, and Canon EF-mount

Designations
Overall/General
 SP — ‘Super Performance’, professional lenses
 Di — ‘Digitally Integrated’, featuring coating optimized for digital SLRs, but still usable on 24×36 mm sensors (35 mm, ‘full’ or double frame)
 Di II — Lenses for APS-C sized sensors only
 Di III — Lenses for compact system cameras
 ZL — ‘Zoom Lock’

Optical technology
 ASL — hybrid ‘ASphericaL’ elements
 GM — ‘Glass Molded aspherical’ elements
 XGM — ‘eXpanded Glass Molded aspherical’ elements
 LD — ‘Low Dispersion’ elements
 XLD — ‘eXtra Low Dispersion’ elements
 XR — ‘eXtra Refractive index’ glass
 UXR — ‘Ultra-eXtra Refractive index’ glass
 AD — ‘Anomalous Dispersion’ elements
 LAH — ‘LD + ASL’ hybrid lens element
 ADH — ‘AD + ASL’ hybrid lens element
 HID — ‘High Index, High Dispersion’ glass
 [IF] — ‘Internal Focusing’

Coating technology
 BBAR — ‘Broad-Band Anti-Reflection’ coating
 BBAR-G2 — ‘Broad-Band Anti-Reflection Generation 2’ coating
 eBAND — nano-structured ‘Extended Bandwidth & Angular-Dependency’ coating
 AX — ‘Anti-reflectioneXpand’ coating
 FLR — ‘FLuoRine compensation’ coating

Autofocus/Electronic technology
 VC — ‘Vibration Compensation’ – in-lens image stabilization (mounts for camera systems with in-body image stabilization typically don't feature VC in the lens. In this case, the lens does not carry the VC designation for this mount.)
 USD — ‘Ultrasonic Silent Drive’ (AF lenses with this designation typically no longer carry the AF designation)
 PZD — ‘Piezo Drive’ (AF lenses with this designation typically no longer carry the AF designation)
 HLD — ‘High/Low torque-modulated Drive’ (AF lenses with this designation typically no longer carry the AF designation)
 RXD — ‘Rapid eXtra-silent stepping Drive’ (AF lenses with this designation typically no longer carry the AF designation)
 VXD — ‘Voice-coil eXtreme-torque Drive’ (AF lenses with this designation typically no longer carry the AF designation)
 OSD — ‘Optimized Silent Drive’ (AF lenses with this designation typically no longer carry the AF designation)
 DC — ‘DC Motor’
 DSP — ‘Digital Signal Processor’
 MPU — ‘MicroProcessing Unit’
 DMPU — ‘Dual MicroProcessing Unit’

Weather-sealing technology
 MR — ‘Moisture-Resistant’ construction
 MP+DR — ‘Moisture-Proof and Dust-Resistant’ construction

Auto-focus lenses

Lenses for 35mm SLR cameras 

 Tamron SP AF 14 mm 2.8 Aspherical [IF] (model 69E, variants 69EM)
 Tamron SP AF 90 mm 2.5 Macro (1:2) (model 52E, variants 52EM)
 Tamron SP AF 90 mm 2.5 Macro (1:2) (model 152E, variants 152EM)
 Tamron SP AF 90 mm 2.8 Macro 1:1 (model 72E, variants 72EM)
 Tamron SP AF 90 mm 2.8 Macro 1:1 (model 172E, variants 172EM)
 Tamron SP AF 300 mm 2.8 LD-IF (model 60E, variants 60EM)
 Tamron SP AF 300 mm 2.8 LD [IF] (model 360E, variants 360EM)
 Tamron SP AF 300 mm 2.8 LD [IF] (model 360EE)

 Tamron AF 19–35 mm 3.5-4.5 (model A10, variants A10M)
 Tamron SP AF 20–40 mm 2.7-3.5 Aspherical-IF (model 166D, variants 166DM)
 Tamron SP AF 20–40 mm 2.7-3.5 Aspherical-IF (model 266D, variants 266DM)
 Tamron AF 24–70 mm 3.3-5.6 Aspherical (model 73D, variants 73DM)
 Tamron SP AF 24–135 mm 3.5-5.6 AD Aspherical [IF] Macro (model 190D, variants 190DM)
 Tamron AF 28–70 mm 3.5-4.5 (model 159D)
 Tamron AF 28–70 mm 3.5-4.5 (model 259D)
 Tamron AF 28–80 mm 3.5-5.6 (model 77D, variants 77DM)
 Tamron AF 28–80 mm 3.5-5.6 Aspherical (model 177D)
 Tamron AF 28–80 mm 3.5-5.6 Aspherical (model 277D)
 Tamron SP AF 28–105 mm 2.8 LD Aspherical-IF (model 176D, variants 176DM)
 Tamron SP AF 28–105 mm 2.8 LD Aspherical-IF (model 276D, variants 276DM)
 Tamron AF 28–105 mm 4-5.6 (model 79D)
 Tamron AF 28–105 mm 4-5.6 Aspherical [IF] (model 179D, variants 179DM)
 Tamron AF 28–200 mm 3.8-5.6 Aspherical (model 71D, variants 71DM)
 Tamron AF 28–200 mm 3.8-5.6 LD Super (model 171D, variants 171DM)
 Tamron AF 28–200 mm 3.8-5.6 LD Aspherical-IF Super Silver (model 271D)
 Tamron AF 28–200 mm 3.8-5.6 LD Aspherical [IF] Super II Macro (model 371D, variants 371DM)
 Tamron AF 28–200 mm 3.8-5.6 Aspherical-IF Super2 Silver (model 471D, variants 471DM)
 Tamron AF 28–200 mm 3.8-5.6 LD Aspherical [IF] Super (model 571D)
 Tamron AF 28–200 mm 3.8-5.6 Super XR Aspherical [IF] Macro (model A03, variants A03M)
 Tamron AF 28–300 mm 3.5-6.3 LD Aspherical [IF] Macro (model 185D, variants 185DM)
 Tamron AF 28–300 mm 3.8-6.3 LD Aspherical-IF Silver (model 285D)
 Tamron AF 28–300 mm 3.5-6.3 Ultra Zoom XR LD Aspherical [IF] Macro (model A06, variants A06M)
 Tamron AF 35–90 mm 4-5.6 (model 63D, variants 63DM)
 Tamron SP AF 35–105 mm 2.8 Aspherical (model 65D, variants 65DM)
 Tamron-F AF 35–135 mm 3.5-4.5 Tele-Macro (model 40D, variant for Minolta A-mount only) (1987-1988)
 Tamron SP AF 70–210 mm 2.8 LD (model 67D, variant 67DM)
 Tamron-F AF 70–210 mm 3.5-4.5 Tele-Macro (model 53D, variant for Minolta A-mount only) (1987-1989)
 Tamron AF 70–210 mm 4-5.6 (model 158D, variants 158DM)
 Tamron AF 70–210 mm 4-5.6 (model 258D, variants 258DM)
 Tamron AF 70–300 mm 4-5.6 (model 172D, variants 172DM)
 Tamron AF 70–300 mm 4-5.6 LD (model 372D)
 Tamron AF 70–300 mm 4-5.6 LD (model 472D)
 Tamron AF 70–300 mm 4-5.6 LD Macro 1:2 (model 572D, variants 572DM)
 Tamron AF 70–300 mm 4-5.6 LD Macro (1:2) (model 772D)
 Tamron AF 75–300 mm 4-5.6 LD (model 672D, variants 672DM)
 Tamron AF 75–300 mm 4-5.6 LD Macro (model 872D)
 Tamron AF 80–210 mm 4.5-5.6 (model 178D)
 Tamron AF 80–210 mm 4.5-5.6 (model 278D)
 Tamron AF 90–300 mm 4.5-5.6 (model 62D, variants 62DM)
 Tamron AF 100–300 mm 5-6.3 (model 86D, variants 86DM)
 Tamron AF 100–300 mm 5-6.3 (model 186D)
 Tamron AF 200–400 mm 5.6 LD-IF (model 75D)
 Tamron AF 200–400 mm 5.6 LD-IF (model 175D)

Di lenses for full-frame DSLR cameras 

 Tamron SP 35mm f/1.4 Di USD
 Tamron SP 35mm f/1.8 Di VC USD
 Tamron SP 45mm f/1.8 Di VC USD
 Tamron SP 85mm f/1.8 Di VC USD
 Tamron SP AF 90 mm 2.8 Di Macro 1:1 (model 272E, variants 272EE, 272EM/272ES, 272EN/272ENII, 272EP)
 Tamron SP 90 mm 2.8 Di VC USD Macro 1:1 / Tamron SP 90 mm 2.8 Di USD Macro 1:1 (model F004, variants F004E, F004N, F004S)
 Tamron SP 90mm 2.8 Di VC USD Macro 1:1 (model F017)
 Tamron SP AF 180 mm 3.5 Di LD [IF] Macro 1:1 (model B01, variants B01E, B01M/B01S, B01N)

 Tamron SP 15-30mm 2.8 Di VC USD / Tamron SP 15-30mm 2.8 Di USD (model A012, variants A012E, A012M/A012S, A012N)
 Tamron SP 15-30mm f/2.8 Di VC USD G2 (model A041, variants A041E, A041N) 
 Tamron SP AF 17–35 mm 2.8-4 Di LD Aspherical [IF] (model A05, variant A05M)
 Tamron 17-35mm f/2.8-4 Di OSD (model A037, variants A037E, A037N)
 Tamron SP 24–70 mm 2.8 Di VC USD / Tamron SP 24–70 mm 2.8 Di USD (model A007, variants A007E, A007N, A007S)
 Tamron SP 24-70mm f/2.8 Di VC USD G2 (model A032, variants A032E, A032N)
 Tamron SP AF 28–75 mm 2.8 XR Di LD Aspherical [IF] Macro (model A09, variants A09E, A09M/A09S, A09N/A09NII, A09P)
 Tamron AF 28–200 mm 3.8-5.6 XR Di Aspherical [IF] Macro (model A031, variants A031E, A031N, A031P, A031S)
 Tamron AF 28–300 mm 3.5-6.3 XR Di LD Aspherical [IF] (model A061, variants A061E, A061M/A061S, A061N, A061P)
 Tamron AF 28–300 mm 3.5-6.3 XR Di VC LD Aspherical [IF] (model A20, variants A20E, A20N/A20NII)
 Tamron 28-300 mm 3.5-6.3 Di VC PZD / Tamron 28-300 mm 3.5-6.3 Di PZD (model A010, variants A010E, A010S)
 Tamron 35–150 mm 2.8-4 Di VC OSD (model A043)
 Tamron SP AF 70–200 mm 2.8 Di LD [IF] Macro (model A001, variants A001E, A001N/A001NII, A001P, A001S)
 Tamron SP 70-200 mm 2.8 Di VC USD / Tamron SP 70-200 mm 2.8 Di USD (model A009, variants A009E, A009N, A009S)
 Tamron SP 70-200mm F/2.8 Di VC USD G2 (model A025, variants A025E, A025N)
 Tamron SP 70-210mm F/4.0 Di VC USD (model A034, variants A034E, A034N))
 Tamron SP 70–300 mm 4-5.6 Di VC USD / Tamron SP 70–300 mm 4-5.6 Di USD (model A005, variants A005E, A005N/A005NII, A005S)
 Tamron AF 70–300 mm 4-5.6 Di LD Macro 1:2 (model A17, variants A17E, A17N/A17NII, A17P, A17S)
 Tamron 100-400mm f/4.5-6.3 Di VC USD (model A035, variants A035E, A035N) 
 Tamron SP 150-600 mm 5-6.3 Di VC USD / Tamron SP 150-600 mm 5-6.3 Di USD (model A011, variants A011E, A011N, A011S)
 Tamron SP 150-600mm f/5-6.3 Di VC USD G2 (model A022, variants A022E, A022N)
 Tamron SP AF 200–500 mm 5-6.3 Di LD [IF] (model A08, variants A08E, A08M/A08S, A08N)

Di II lenses for APS-C format DSLR cameras 

 Tamron SP AF 60 mm 2.0 Di II LD [IF] Macro 1:1 (model G005, variants G005E, G005N/G005NII, G005S)

 Tamron SP AF 10–24 mm 3.5-4.5 Di II LD Aspherical [IF] (model B001, variants B001E, B001N/B001NII, B001P, B001S)
 Tamron 10-24mm f/3.5-4.5 Di II VC HLD (model B023, variants B023C, B023N)
 Tamron SP AF 11–18 mm 4.5-5.6 Di II LD Aspherical [IF] (model A13, variants A13M)
 Tamron 16-300 mm 3.5-6.3 Di II VC PZD Macro / Tamron 16-300 mm 3.5-6.3 Di II PZD Macro (model B016, variants B016E, B016N, B016S)
 Tamron SP AF 17–50 mm 2.8 XR Di II LD Aspherical [IF] (model A16, variants A16E, A16N/A16NII, A16P, A16S)
 Tamron SP AF 17–50 mm 2.8 XR Di II VC LD Aspherical [IF] (model B005, variants B005E, B005N/B005NII)
 Tamron AF 18–200 mm 3.5-6.3 XR Di II LD Aspherical [IF] (model A14, variants A14E, A14M/A14S, A14N/A14NII, A14P)
 Tamron 18-200mm F/3.5-6.3 Di II VC (model B018, variants B018C, B018N)
 Tamron AF 18–250 mm 3.5-6.3 Di II LD Aspherical [IF] Macro (model A18, variants A18E, A18N/A18NII, A18P, A18S)
 Tamron AF 18–270 mm 3.5-6.3 Di II VC LD Aspherical [IF] Macro (model B003, variants B003E, B003N/B003NII)
 Tamron 18-270 mm 3.5-6.3 Di II VC PZD / Tamron 18-270 mm 3.5-6.3 Di II PZD (model B008, variants B008E, B008N, B008S)
Tamron AF 18–400 mm 3.5-6.3 Di II VC HLD (model B028)
 Tamron AF 55–200 mm 4-5.6 Di II LD Macro (model A15, variants A15E, A15M/A15S, A15N/A15NII)
 Tamron SP AF 90mm f/2.8 Di 1:1 Macro

Di III lenses for digital compact system cameras 

 Tamron 14-150 mm 3.5-5.8 Di III (model C001)
 Tamron 17-28mm f/2.8 Di III RXD for full-frame Sony E-mount
Tamron 17-70mm f/2.8 Di III-A VC RXD for APS-C Sony E-mount (B070, announced December 2020)
 Tamron 28-75mm f/2.8 Di III RXD for full-frame Sony E-mount (A036, available January 2019)
Tamron 28-75mm f/2.8 Di III VXD G2 for full-frame Sony E-mount (A063, available October 2021)
 Tamron 28-200mm f/2.8-5.6 Di III RXD for full-frame Sony E-mount (A071, available June 2020)
Tamron 35-150mm f/2-2.8 Di III VXD for full-frame Sony E-mount (A058, available October 2021)
 Tamron 70-180mm f/2.8 Di III VXD for full-frame Sony E-mount (A056, available May 2020)
 Tamron 20mm f/2.8 Di III OSD for full-frame Sony E-mount
 Tamron 24mm f/2.8 Di III OSD for full-frame Sony E-mount
 Tamron 35mm f/2.8 Di III OSD for full-frame Sony E-mount
 Tamron 18-200 mm 3.5-6.3 Di III VC (model B011, variants B011EM, B011S)

Manual focus lenses

Adaptall-2 lenses and adapters (discontinued 2005/2006)

Adaptall-2 interchangeable mounts produced for:

Adaptall lenses and adapters

Adaptall (first series) mount lenses

Adaptall (first series) interchangeable mounts produced for:

Adapt-A-Matic lenses and adapters
Adapt-A-Matic mount lenses

Adapt-A-Matic interchangeable mounts produced for:

T2 lenses and adapters
T2 screw mount lenses

T2 interchangeable mounts produced for: (Manufactured by Tamron, as well as third party manufacturers)

See also
List of Tamron lenses with Nikon F-mount and integrated autofocus motor

References

 History of Tamron, Adaptall-2.com

External links

 Tamron official website
 Tamron Europe website
 Tamron USA website
 Tamron Canadian consumer website
 Tamron Hong Kong website
 Tamron Taiwan website
 Tamron India website
 Tamron Russia website
 Tamron China website

 
Companies listed on the Tokyo Stock Exchange
Manufacturing companies of Japan
Companies based in Saitama Prefecture
Lens manufacturers
Optics manufacturing companies
Japanese brands
Technology companies established in 1950
Japanese companies established in 1950